The 20th Directors Guild of America Awards, honoring the outstanding directorial achievements in film and television in 1967, were presented in 1968.

Winners and nominees

Film

Television

D.W. Griffith Award
 Alfred Hitchcock

Honorary Life Member
 Darryl F. Zanuck

External links
 

Directors Guild of America Awards
1967 film awards
1967 television awards
1967 awards in the United States
Direct
Direct